Hard Rock is a census-designated place (CDP) in Navajo County, Arizona, United States. The population was 94 at the 2010 census.

Geography
Hard Rock is located at  (36.030914, −110.504842).

Demographics

As of the 2010 census, there were 94 people living in the CDP: 43 male and 51 female. 37 were 19 years old or younger, 20 were ages 20–34, 17 were between the ages of 35 and 49, 9 were between 50 and 64, and the remaining 11 were aged 65 and above. The median age was 30.0 years.

The racial makeup of the CDP was 94.7% American Indian, 3.2% Asian, 1.1% White, and 5.3% two or more races.  12.8% of the population were Hispanic or Latino of any race.

There were 28 households in the CDP, 20 family households (71.4%) and 8 non-family households (28.6%), with an average household size of 3.36. Of the family households, 10 were married couples living together, 8 were single mothers, and 2 w3ere single fathers; the non-family households included 8 adults living alone: 3 male and 5 female.

The CDP contained 41 housing units, of which 28 were occupied and 13 were vacant.

References

Census-designated places in Navajo County, Arizona